Xue Yuyang (born October 4, 1982) is a Chinese retired professional basketball player. Xue was selected 57th overall in the 2003 NBA Draft by the Dallas Mavericks, who traded the pick to the Denver Nuggets.

Professional career

NBA draft
In 2003, Xue entered the National Basketball Association Draft, without official permission, and the Chinese authorities refused to let him play in the United States. He was selected 57th overall by the Dallas Mavericks, who traded the pick to the Denver Nuggets. However, as he had not received the necessary clearance from the Chinese Basketball Association, Denver did not sign him to an NBA contract.

CBA career
Xue began his career with Jilin Northeast Tigers where he played until the end of the 2002-2003 season, entering and being selected on the NBA draft. Afterwards he was signed by the Hong Kong Flying Dragons of the CBA, however, after being relegated the team folded, turning him into a free agent, so he signed with the Xinjiang Flying Tigers where he stayed until 2011 where he signed with Qingdao DoubleStar where he played until the end of the 2013-2014 season.

Move to the NBL
On August 24, 2014 he signed with Henan Shedianlaojiu for the rest of the season.

Moving on to Europe
In 2016, Xue would decide to branch out into Europe with the BC Pasvalio Pieno Zvaigzde in Lithuania. He would become the second Chinese player to play in European nations, with the first being Shang Ping playing for the Panathinaikos B.C. in the Greek Basket League from 2013-14.

References

External links
 NBA.com Draft profile

1982 births
Living people
Centers (basketball)
Basketball players from Henan
Chinese men's basketball players
Dallas Mavericks draft picks
Jilin Northeast Tigers players
People from Jiaozuo
Power forwards (basketball)
Qingdao Eagles players
Sportspeople from Henan
Xinjiang Flying Tigers players